Frutikulturë is a village in Tirana County, Albania. It is part of the municipality Kamëz.

References

Populated places in Kamëz
Villages in Tirana County